Rufat Huseynov (born 25 April 1997) is an Azerbaijani boxer. He competed in the men's light flyweight event at the 2016 Summer Olympics.

References

External links
 
 
 
 

1997 births
Living people
Azerbaijani male boxers
Olympic boxers of Azerbaijan
Boxers at the 2016 Summer Olympics
Sportspeople from Ganja, Azerbaijan
Boxers at the 2014 Summer Youth Olympics
European Games competitors for Azerbaijan
Boxers at the 2019 European Games
Light-flyweight boxers
Youth Olympic gold medalists for Azerbaijan
20th-century Azerbaijani people
21st-century Azerbaijani people